Cyrtomoptera is a genus of soldier beetles in the family Cantharidae. There are at least two described species in Cyrtomoptera.

Species
These two species belong to the genus Cyrtomoptera:
 Cyrtomoptera dentata McKey-Fender, 1944
 Cyrtomoptera divisa (LeConte, 1851)

References

Further reading

 
 

Cantharidae
Articles created by Qbugbot